Donnie Burns MBE was born in Hamilton, South Lanarkshire, Scotland in 1959, where he attended Holy Cross High School. He is a Scottish professional ballroom dancer, specialising in Latin dance.

He and his former partner Gaynor Fairweather were 16-time World Professional Latin champions: this is by some way the record for this title. They were also eleven times International Latin American Dance Champions, and this is also a record. On their competitive retirement both were honoured by appointment as Members of the Order of the British Empire (MBE) in the 1991 Birthday Honours. Donnie was undefeated in any competitive dance contest for nearly 20 years of continuous competition, a record in any major category of  ballroom dance; this is now in the Guinness Book of Records. During this period he won major titles in countries throughout the world.

Since 2005, he has been President   of the World Dance Council. He is a winner of the Carl Alan Award for outstanding services to dance. In 2008, Burns married swing dance and International Latin dancer Heidi Groskreutz.

Burns was the hero of the character Mr. Aoki in the 1996 Japanese film Shall We Dance?.

Burns also appeared during week 7 of the 12th season of Dancing with the Stars.

References 

1959 births
Scottish male dancers
British ballroom dancers
Dance teachers
Members of the Order of the British Empire
Living people
People educated at Holy Cross High School, Hamilton